Master Mateo (c. 1150 - c. 1200 or c. 1217) was a sculptor and architect who worked in medieval Christian kingdoms of the Iberian Peninsula during the second half of the twelfth century.  He is best known now for the Pórtico de la Gloria of the Cathedral of Santiago de Compostela.  He was also responsible for the stone choir of the cathedral in 1200, later torn down in 1603. 

The earliest information about Maestro Mateo is from an 1168 document in the archives of the cathedral of Santiago, which says that the Master was already working on the Cathedral of Santiago de Compostela, for which he received a large sum of money from King Ferdinand II of León.

Very little information remains about his early training, but everything seems to imply that he already had a long career behind him all along the Way of Santiago, especially in the French sections.

Bibliography

 Spanish and Galician articles about Maestro/Mestre Mateo
http://www.visual-arts-cork.com/sculpture/master-mateo.htm
http://www.wga.hu/html_m/m/master/mateo/p_gloria.html
 :gl:Coro pétreo do Mestre Mateo

12th-century Spanish sculptors
13th-century Spanish sculptors
Medieval Spanish architects
Romanesque architects
Year of birth unknown
Year of death unknown
Year of birth uncertain
Romanesque artists
12th-century Spanish architects
13th-century Spanish architects
12th-century people from León and Castile
13th-century Castilians